is a Japanese professional baseball pitcher for the Hokkaido Nippon-Ham Fighters of the Nippon Professional Baseball(NPB). He previously played for the Orix Buffaloes.

Career
Kaneko pitched for the Orix Buffaloes. He won the Pacific League Most Valuable Player Award and the Eiji Sawamura Award in 2014. He became a free agent after the 2018 season, and signed with the Hokkaido Nippon-Ham Fighters.

On October 19, 2019, Kaneko signed a 1-year extension to remain with the Fighters.

References

External links

1983 births
Living people
Hokkaido Nippon-Ham Fighters players
Japanese baseball players
Nippon Professional Baseball MVP Award winners
Nippon Professional Baseball pitchers
Orix Buffaloes players
Baseball people from Niigata Prefecture